José Campos may refer to:

 José Campos (footballer) (born 1983), Salvadoran footballer
 José Campos (baseball) (born 1992), baseball player
 José-Antonio Campos-Ortega (1940–2004), German neurobiologist 
 Bernardino José de Campos Júnior (1841–1915), Brazilian politician
 Jose Yao Campos (1922–2016), Filipino businessman
 Jose C. Campos (1923–2005), Filipino jurist and the 129th Associate Justice of the Supreme Court of the Philippines
 Jose Campos, member of the New Mexico House of Representatives
 Jose Campos, fictional character on Golgo 13
 Jose Campos, soccer player for the Long Island Rough Riders